The Blue Mountains are a mountain range in the northwestern United States, located largely in northeastern Oregon and stretching into extreme southeastern Washington.

The Blue Mountains cover ten counties across two states; they are Union, Umatilla, Grant, Baker, Wallowa and Harney counties in Oregon, and Walla Walla, Columbia, Garfield and Asotin counties in Washington. The mountains are unique as the home of the world's largest living organism, a subterranean colonial mycelial mat of the fungus Armillaria ostoyae. The Blue Mountains were named after the color of the mountains when seen from a distance.

Geology
The Blues are uplift mountains and contain some of the oldest rocks in Oregon. Rocks as old as 400 million years protrude through surrounding Columbia River Basalt flows of 52 million to 6 million years ago.
Geologically, the Blue Mountains were created as an island arc in the Pacific Ocean and accreted onto the North American plate. Within these terranes are igneous intrusions which may have intruded before or after accretion. They are made up of several mountain ranges, from the Ochoco Mountains and Maury Mountains in the west near Prineville, Oregon, through the Greenhorn Mountains, the Aldrich Mountains, and the Strawberry Range, to the Elkhorn Mountains.

History

Habitation by Native Americans

The river valleys and lower levels of the range were occupied by indigenous peoples for thousands of years. Historic tribes of the region included the Walla Walla, Cayuse people and Umatilla, now acting together as the Confederated Tribes of the Umatilla Indian Reservation, located mostly in Umatilla County, Oregon.  The southern portion of the Blue Mountains were inhabited by several different bands of the Northern Paiute, a Great Basin culture. Native American tribes originally migrated to the Blue Mountains for hunting and salmon runs. The Natives used to purposefully burn small parts of the forest in order to create pastures to attract game for hunting.

During westward expansion of the United States

In the mid-1800s, the Blue Mountains were a formidable obstacle to settlers traveling on the Oregon Trail and were often the last mountain range American pioneers had to cross before either reaching southeast Washington near Walla Walla or passing down the Columbia River Gorge to the end of the Oregon Trail in the Willamette Valley near Oregon City.

Modern travel

The range is currently traversed by Interstate 84, which crosses the crest of the range at a  summit, from south-southeast to north-northwest between La Grande and Pendleton. The community of Baker City is located along the south-eastern flank of the range.

It is also crossed by the Union Pacific Railroad's mainline between Portland, Oregon, and Pocatello, Idaho, which crests the summit at Kamela, Oregon. The summit lies on Union Pacific's La Grande Subdivision, which runs between La Grande and Hinkle, the latter of which is the site of a major UP yard.

Wildlife 
Birds of the area include bald eagle, northern spotted owl, Lewis's woodpecker, Williamson's sapsucker, red-breasted nuthatch, golden-crowned kinglet and many migratory species, with the riverbanks important habitat for this birdlife. Mammals that move through the mountain grasslands include Rocky Mountain elk (including the largest herd in North America at Hells Canyon), Bighorn sheep and Mule deer. Native fish include Chinook Salmon, Steelhead, Redband Trout, Coho Salmon, Bull Trout, and Pacific Lamprey.

The Blue Mountains in Washington are home to one of 10 identified elk herds in the state, with a population of approximately 4,500 Rocky Mountain elk as of 2018 across the region. In 1989, in response to a decline in the elk population and a heavy female-biased population, the Washington Fish & Wildlife Department regulated elk hunting in the Washington Blue Mountains with a "spike-only" general hunting season, permitting hunting of only male elk with at least one visible non-branched antler. By the mid 1990s the area then became known for its mature males and trophy hunting. In 2018, Washington State proposed an updated elk management plan intended to improve the health of elk populations and habitats, reduce human conflict and agricultural damage, and managing elk populations for recreational, educational, scientific, and ceremonial purposes.

During winter months elk will prefer to  use "moderately steep south slopes" rather than northern slopes because of the southern slopes being warmer and containing less snow.

Land management 
The public lands in the Blue Mountains are managed not only by the United States Forest Service and the Bureau of Land Management, but also by land owners and the Confederated Tribes of the Umatilla Indian Reservation.

Location

Much of the range is included in the Malheur National Forest, Umatilla National Forest, and Wallowa–Whitman National Forest. Several wilderness areas encompass remote parts of the range, including the North Fork Umatilla Wilderness, the North Fork John Day Wilderness, the Strawberry Mountain Wilderness, and the Monument Rock Wilderness, all of which are in Oregon. The Wenaha–Tucannon Wilderness sits astride the Oregon–Washington border.

Drainage

The range is drained by several rivers, including the Grande Ronde and Tucannon, tributaries of the Snake, as well as the forks of the John Day, Umatilla and Walla Walla rivers, tributaries of the Columbia. The southernmost portion of the Blue Mountains is drained by the Silvies River, in the endorheic Harney Basin.

See also

 List of mountain ranges of Oregon

References

External links

Mountain ranges of Oregon
Mountain ranges of Washington (state)
Physiographic sections
Landforms of Columbia County, Washington
Landforms of Garfield County, Washington
Mountain ranges of Grant County, Oregon
Landforms of Wallowa County, Oregon
Mountain ranges of Baker County, Oregon
Landforms of Union County, Oregon
Landforms of Umatilla County, Oregon
Malheur National Forest
Wallowa–Whitman National Forest
Umatilla National Forest